Ritu or Kaalanilai means "season" in different ancient Indian calendars used in India, Bangladesh, Nepal and Sri Lanka. There are six ritus (also transliterated ritu) or seasons. The word is derived from the Vedic Sanskrit word Ṛtú, a fixed or appointed time, especially the proper time for sacrifice (yajna) or ritual in Vedic religion; this in turn comes from the word Ṛta (ऋत), as used in Vedic Sanskrit literally means the "order or course of things". This word is used in nearly all Indian languages.

North, West, Central Indian and Andhra  Pradesh calendars 
Nepal and India observes six ecological seasons.

East Indian calendars
East Indian calendars (Bengali, Assamese, Odia and Mithila) start their new year on Mesh Sankranti. The season names corresponds to the Sanskrit Vasanta, Grishma, Varsha, Sharada, Hemanta, Shishira order.
The Bengali Calendar is similar to the Sanskrit calendar above, but differs in start and end times which moves certain dates/days around (i.e., Vasant Panchami occurs here in Vasant ritu but in the calendar above, it occurs in Shishir as that is the Magha Shukla Panchami). The East Indian Calendar has the following seasons or ritus:

Bengali Calendar

Maithili Calendar
Season in the Maithili Calendar

Odia Calendar
Seasons in the Odia calendar:

South Indian calendars

Malayalam Kannada Calendar 
The Malayalam calendar or Kollam Era, a solar and sidereal Hindu calendar used in Kerala, and in Karnataka they follows a pattern of six seasons slightly different from North Indian Calendars.

Tamil calendar
The Tamil Calendar follows a similar pattern of six seasons as described in the Hindu calendar.

In culture
The seasons are described in literature such as the Sanskrit poem Ṛtusaṃhāra written by the legendary Sanskrit poet Kālidāsa.

Names of the ritu are commonly used for persons: typically, Vasant, Sharad, Hemant, Shishir and Varsh are "male" names; "female" names include Vasanti, Sharada, Hemanti, Grishma and Varsha.

Similar naming conventions are also used in Tamil: For female Ilavenil. For male Kar(Vannan).

See also 
Astronomical basis of the Hindu Calendar
Vedic timekeeping

References

Further reading

Feller, Danielle. The Seasons in Mahākāvya Literature, Eastern Book Linkers, Delhi, 1995, 
Raghavan, V. Ṛtu in Sanskrit literature, Shri Lal Bahadur Shastri Kendriya Sanskrit Vidyapeetha, Delhi, 1972
Renou, Louis. Sanskrit et culture, Payot, 1950
Selby, Martha Ann (translator). The Circle of Six Seasons, Penguin, New Delhi, 2003, 

Hindu calendar
Seasons

hi:ऋतु
ru:Риту